Joan Theresa Garrity (1940 – January 30, 2022) was an American author, best known as the author of The Sensuous Woman.

Background and education

Garrity was raised in Lee's Summit, Missouri, and studied at Palm Beach Junior College in Florida. She worked on the staff of publisher Lyle Stuart and published a book about shopping in New York.

Career
In 1969 she published, under the pseudonym of "J.", The Sensuous Woman, subtitled "the first how-to book for the female who yearns to be all woman". It was also published as The Way to Become the Sensuous Woman. The book spent eight weeks at No. 1 on the New York Times bestseller list and nearly a year on the list overall. In later editions, she used the name Terry Garrity. A spoken-word record album was made in 1969, based on the book, called J – The Way To Become A Sensuous Woman.

In 1977, she published Total Loving: how to love and be loved for the rest of your life, and in 1984, Story of "J": the author of The Sensuous Woman tells the bitter price of her crazy success, with her brother John Garrity as co-author. In this book she and her brother discuss how she coped with bipolar disorder.

References

Further reading
 Bill Althaus, "Putting 'J' behind Her: For Terry Garrity, Success Was Almost Fatal", Kansas City Magazine, October 1984

External links 

 Portrait of Terry [Joan Theresa] Garrity in playful pose, 1973. Los Angeles Times Photographic Archive (Collection 1429). UCLA Library Special Collections, Charles E. Young Research Library, University of California, Los Angeles. 

1940s births
2022 deaths
American relationships and sexuality writers
20th-century American women writers
20th-century American non-fiction writers
People from Lee's Summit, Missouri
People with bipolar disorder
American women non-fiction writers
21st-century American women